4-Hydroxy-α-methyltryptamine (4-HO-αMT) is a psychedelic drug of the tryptamine class. It is a close structural analogue of α-methyltryptamine (αMT) and produces similar effects to it, but with exacerbated side effects similarly to 5-MeO-αMT. Alexander Shulgin describes 4-HO-αMT briefly in his book TiHKAL:

See also

References 

Psychedelic tryptamines
Hydroxyarenes